Lovill's Creek Lake is a man-made lake located in Carroll County, Virginia.

It was created in 1990 by the United States Department of Agriculture Natural Resources Conservation Service.

As of 2019 the area has become the home of two Bald Eagles who have taken up residence at the lake. Documented through eBird by local birding enthusiasts brother sister duo Dakota and Cassandra

References

Artificial lakes of the United States